Beat Zberg (born 10 May 1971 in Altdorf, Uri) is a Swiss former professional road bicycle racer for UCI ProTeam Gerolsteiner.

In 2007 he became the Swiss National champion, winning the road race alone and over 2 minutes ahead of 2nd placed Fabian Cancellara. Later that year, he retired from active competition.

Career achievements

Major results

1988
1st  National Junior Mountain Championships
National Junior Track Championships
 1 km time trial
 Omnium
1989
1st Stage 1 Grand Prix Rüebliland
1st  Road race, National Junior Road Championships
1st  National Junior Mountain Championships
National Junior Track Championships
 Omnium 
 Pursuit
3rd Overall Tour du Pays de Vaud
1990
2nd Kaistenberg Rundfahrt
1991
1st Wartenberg Rundfahrt
2nd Overall GP Tell
1st Stage 8
3rd  Amateur Road race, UCI Road World Championships
1992
1st  Overall Étoile de Bessèges
1st Trofeo Matteotti
1st Giro di Romagna
1st Wartenberg Rundfahrt
5th Overall Tour de Suisse
5th Tre Valli Varesine
6th Overall Tirreno–Adriatico
6th Giro di Lombardia
1993
1st Gran Piemonte
1st Kaistenberg Rundfahrt
9th Overall Tour de Suisse
9th Subida a Urkiola
1994
1st Stage 3 Vuelta a Asturias 
2nd GP Lugano
2nd Time trial, National Road Championships
1995
1st  Overall Vuelta a Asturias
1st Stage 6 
1st Trofeo Calvià
3rd Amstel Gold Race
3rd Wartenberg Rundfahrt
3rd Josef Voegeli Memorial 
5th Overall Tour de Romandie
1st Stage 1 
5th Overall Tour de Suisse
7th La Flèche Wallonne
9th Overall Tirreno–Adriatico
10th Rund um den Henninger Turm
1996
1st Rund um den Henninger Turm
1st Berner Rundfahrt
2nd Grand Prix Pino Cerami 
3rd Giro della Provincia di Reggio Calabria
5th Overall GP Tell
7th Overall Tour de Romandie
10th Amstel Gold Race 
1997
1st Subida a Urkiola
1st Coppa Placci
1st Giro del Mendrisiotto
1st Josef Voegeli Memorial
2nd Wartenberg Rundfahrt
3rd Overall Tirreno–Adriatico
3rd Overall Tour de Romandie
3rd Overall À travers Lausanne
3rd Amstel Gold Race
4th Trofeo Laigueglia
7th Liège–Bastogne–Liège
8th La Flèche Wallonne
9th Milano–Torino
10th Overall Tour de Suisse
1998
1st  Overall Tour of Austria
1st Prologue
1st  Road race, National Road Championships
1st Josef Voegeli Memorial
2nd Overall Tour de Suisse
6th Time trial, UCI Road World Championships
9th Overall Tour of the Basque Country
1999
2nd Overall Tour de Romandie
2nd Tour du Haut Var
2nd Classic Haribo
2nd Paris-Brussels
3rd Overall Vuelta a Murcia
4th Grand Prix des Nations
6th Overall Tour Méditerranéen
2000
4th Giro di Lombardia
10th Trofeo Melinda
2001
1st Stage 13 Vuelta a España 
1st GP Winterthur
2nd GP Lugano
4th Overall Tour de Suisse
5th Overall Bayern Rundfahrt
6th Rund um den Henninger Turm
6th Giro di Lombardia
7th Overall Tour Méditerranéen
7th Coppa Ugo Agostoni
8th Overall Tirreno–Adriatico
10th GP Ouest–France
10th Road race, UCI Road World Championships
2002
1st Stage 1 Tour of the Basque Country
2003
1st Stage 2 Setmana Catalana de Ciclisme
4th Giro di Lombardia
7th Overall Vuelta a Murcia
7th Overall Sachsen Tour
8th Overall Tour Méditerranéen
8th Overall Route du Sud
2004
1st Stage 2 Setmana Catalana de Ciclisme
1st Stage 2 Tour of the Basque Country
7th GP Lugano
9th GP Chiasso
2005
7th Overall Tour de Suisse
2006
1st Grand Prix of Aargau Canton
2nd Overall Bayern Rundfahrt
1st Stage 4 (ITT)
2007
1st  Road race, National Road Championships
4th Overall Tour de l'Ain
1st  Points classification
1st Stage 1
7th Overall Rothaus Regio-Tour

Grand Tour general classification results timeline

References

External links 

Cyclists at the 1996 Summer Olympics
Olympic cyclists of Switzerland
Swiss male cyclists
1971 births
Living people
Swiss Vuelta a España stage winners
People from the canton of Uri